Metaljka (Serbian Cyrillic: Метаљка) is a village in the municipality of Čajniče, Bosnia and Herzegovina.

References

Populated places in Čajniče
Bosnia and Herzegovina–Montenegro border crossings